Sarah Lewis  (born 29 November 1964 in London) is a British former alpine skier who competed in the 1988 Winter Olympics. She was the Secretary General of FIS for 20 years until she was removed in October 2020.

She was awarded the Femme en or prize in 2006, and OBE in 2018, for heading up the largest Winter Sports International Governing Body.

References

External links
 

1964 births
Living people
Sportspeople from London
English female alpine skiers
Olympic alpine skiers of Great Britain
Alpine skiers at the 1988 Winter Olympics
Officers of the Order of the British Empire
People educated at the City of London School for Girls